Saidabad Rural District is in the Central District of Ijrud County, Zanjan province, Iran. At the National Census of 2006, its population was 3,706 in 1,064 households. There were 3,496 inhabitants in 1,136 households at the following census of 2011. At the most recent census of 2016, the population of the rural district was 3,228 in 1,088 households. The largest of its seven villages was Saidabad-e Sofla, with 976 people.

References 

Ijrud County

Rural Districts of Zanjan Province

Populated places in Zanjan Province

Populated places in Ijrud County